Aleksandr Vasilyev (born 26 July 1961) is a Belarusian former track and field hurdler who competed in the 400 metres hurdles for the Soviet Union. He set his lifetime best of 47.92 seconds for the event in Moscow in 1985. This remains the Belarusian national record.

Vasilyev established himself with a gold medal at the Friendship Games in 1984. A slew of silver medals followed at the 1985 European Cup, 1985 IAAF World Cup, 1986 European Athletics Championships, and the 1986 Goodwill Games.

He won four consecutive national title at the Soviet Athletics Championships from 1985 to 1988. He ranked as Europe's second best 400 m hurdler in 1984, 1985 and 1986, behind only Harald Schmid. His highest career global ranking was in 1985, when he was fourth on the world lists.

International competitions

National titles
Soviet Athletics Championships
400 m hurdles: 1985, 1986, 1987, 1988

References

External links

Living people
1961 births
Soviet male hurdlers
Belarusian male hurdlers
European Athletics Championships medalists
World Athletics Championships athletes for the Soviet Union
Goodwill Games medalists in athletics
Competitors at the 1986 Goodwill Games
Friendship Games medalists in athletics